Bohdan Horyn (born  in Kniselo, Lwów Voivodeship) is a Ukrainian human rights activist and dissident. He was a People's Deputy of the first and second convocations of the Verkhovna Rada from May 15, 1990, to May 12, 1998.

His older brother is Mykhailo Horyn (1930-2013), also was a Ukrainian human rights activist and Soviet dissident.

Biography 
Bohdan Horyn was born on February 10, 1936, in the village of Kniselo, now Stryi Raion, Lviv Oblast.

He graduated from Ivan Franko Lviv State University, Faculty of Philology in 1959. He became a philologist and a teacher of Ukrainian language and literature.

In 1988 he was one of the founders of the Ukrainian Helsinki Union.

In 1990—1997 he was a member of the Ukrainian Republican Party Board and Council.

From 1994 to 1996 he was the director of the Institute for Diaspora Studies.

In 2019 he won the Shevchenko National Prize in the category "Journalism".

References

1936 births
Living people
People from Lviv Oblast
People's Movement of Ukraine politicians
First convocation members of the Verkhovna Rada
Second convocation members of the Verkhovna Rada
Ukrainian human rights activists
Ukrainian dissidents
Soviet dissidents